Cambridgeshire County Council is the county council of Cambridgeshire, England. The council consists of 61 councillors, representing 59 electoral divisions. The council is based at New Shire Hall at Alconbury Weald, near Huntingdon. It is a member of the East of England Local Government Association.

Since May 2021, it has been run by a joint administration of the Liberal Democrats, Labour Party, and independent groups.

History
Cambridgeshire County Council was first formed in 1889 as a result of the Local Government Act 1888, as one of two county councils covering Cambridgeshire; the other was the Isle of Ely County Council. In 1965 the two councils were merged to form Cambridgeshire and Isle of Ely County Council.

This arrangement lasted until 1974 when, following the Local Government Act 1972, Cambridgeshire and Isle of Ely was merged with Huntingdon and Peterborough to form a new non-metropolitan county of Cambridgeshire under the control of a newly constituted Cambridgeshire County Council. The first elections to the new authority were in April 1973, and the council took office on 1 April 1974.

From its re-creation in 1974 until 1998 the county council administered the entire county of Cambridgeshire. In 1998 Peterborough City Council became a unitary authority, thus outside the area of the county council. For ceremonial, geographic and certain administrative purposes however, Peterborough continues to be associated and work in collaboration with Cambridgeshire County Council.

Until 2021, the county council had its offices and meeting place in Cambridge, being based at different times at the Guildhall, County Hall, and Shire Hall. In 2021 the council vacated Shire Hall and left Cambridge, moving to New Shire Hall at Alconbury Weald in the parish of The Stukeleys, north-west of Huntingdon. The first committee meeting to be held at New Shire Hall was in September 2021.

Responsibilities
The council is responsible for public services such as education, transport, highways, heritage, social care, libraries, trading standards, and waste management.

District councils
The county council is the upper-tier of local government, below which are five councils with responsibility for local services such as housing, planning applications, licensing, council tax collection and rubbish collection. The districts of Cambridgeshire are:

 Cambridge City Council
 East Cambridgeshire District Council
 Fenland District Council
 Huntingdonshire District Council
 South Cambridgeshire District Council

Composition

Councillors and electoral divisions

Coat of Arms
Granted on 1 November 1976.

Blazon: "Or three Palets wavy alternating with two Palets Azure a Bordure Gules flory on the inner edge Or; the Shield ensigned by a Mural Crown Or."

Supporters: On either side a Great Bustard proper the exterior leg resting on a closed Book Gules garnished Or pendent from the neck of the dexter by a Cord Argent two keys in saltire wards uppermost uppermost and outwards Gules and from the neck of the sinister by a like Cord a Hunting Horn mouth to the dexter Or.

Badge: Within an Annulet ensigned by a Coronet a Bar Or between two Bars wavy Azure.

Motto: 'CORDE UNO SAPIENTES SIMUS' which translates as "With one heart let us be men and women of understanding".

Lender option borrower option loans
The council has long term lender option borrower option loans (LOBOs) totalling £79.5 million with Barclays, Dexia and Siemens Financial Services.

See also
Cambridgeshire County Council elections

References

External links
Cambridgeshire County Council

 
Local government in Cambridgeshire
County Council
County councils of England
1889 establishments in England
1974 establishments in England
1965 disestablishments in England
Local education authorities in England
Local authorities in Cambridgeshire
Major precepting authorities in England
Leader and cabinet executives